Daylight is an unincorporated community in Scott Township, Vanderburgh County, in the U.S. state of Indiana.

History
A post office was established at Daylight in 1900, but was soon discontinued in 1903.

Geography

References

Unincorporated communities in Indiana
Unincorporated communities in Vanderburgh County, Indiana